The 1937 Western Kentucky State Teachers Hilltoppers football team represented Western Kentucky State Teachers College (now known as Western Kentucky University) in the 1937 college football season. They were led Carl “Swede” Anderson, in his last year at the school, and team captain Clarence Caple.  Caple and Joe Cook were named to the All Kentucky Team.

Schedule

References

Western Kentucky State Teachers
Western Kentucky Hilltoppers football seasons
Western Kentucky State Teachers Hilltoppers football